Shahidul Islam Khokon (15 May 1957 – 4 April 2016) was a Bangladeshi filmmaker and producer.

Career
Khokon debuted as a director on 1985 through his film Rokter Bondi. He directed more than 30 films and most of them were commercially successful.

Works

References

External links

1957 births
2016 deaths
People from Barisal District
Bangladeshi film directors
Neurological disease deaths in Bangladesh
Deaths from motor neuron disease